The following is a timeline of the history of the city of Nagasaki, Japan.

Prior to 20th century

 12th C. - Included in the fief of Nagasaki Kotaro.
 1571 -  established; opens to foreign ships.
 1597 - 26 Christians executed.
 1614 - Suwa Shrine built.
 1626 - Nagasaki Kunchi (shrine festival) begins.
 1634 - Megane Bridge built.
 1637 - Shimabara Rebellion occurs near Nagasaki.
 1638 - Sannō Shrine founded.
 1641 - "Dutch Confined to Dejima Island" in Nagasaki harbor.
 1855 - "Modern shipbuilding yard" established.
 1858 - Port opened to foreign trade.
 1861 - Nagasaki Shipping List and Advertiser begins publication.
 1865 - Catholic Ōura Church built.
 1876 - Saikai Shimbun (newspaper) begins publication.
 1877 - Immaculate Conception Cathedral, Nagasaki founded.
 1887 - Population: 40,187.
 1888 - Sakamoto International Cemetery established.
 1889 - Value of imports £1,005,367.
 1893 - Mitsubishi Nagasaki Zosensho (shipyard) active.
 1894 - Value of imports £444,839.
 1898 - Kyushu Tosu-Nogasaki railway begins operating.

20th century

 1902 -  (newspaper) begins publication.
 1903 - Population: 151,727.
 1905
 Nagasaki Station opens.
  founded.
 Population: 163,324.
 1915 - Nagasaki Electric Tramway begins operating.
 1923 -  established.
 1925 - Population: 189,071.
 1945
 August 9: Atomic bombing of Nagasaki by US forces.
 Population: 142,748.
 1949 - Nagasaki University established.
 1950 - Population: 241,805.
 1955 - Sister city relationship established with Saint Paul, United States.
 1957 - Glover house (museum) opens.
 1959 - Nagasaki Aquarium founded.
 1972 - Sister city relationship established with Santos, Brazil.
 1974 - Population: 445,655.
 1978 - Sister city relationships established with Middelburg, Netherlands, and Porto, Portugal.
 1979 - Hitoshi Motoshima becomes mayor.
 1980
 Nagasaki Bio Park founded.
 Sister city relationship established with Fuzhou, China.
 Population: 502,799.
 1990 - January 18: , targeting mayor Motoshima.
 1995 - Iccho Itoh becomes mayor.
 1996 - Nagasaki Atomic Bomb Museum built.
 2000 - Population: 423,163.

21st century

 2001 -  opens.
 2002 - Use of Nagasaki Smart Card on public transit begins.
 2005
 Iōjima, Kōyagi, Nomozaki, Sanwa, Sotome, and Takashima become part of city.
 Nagasaki Museum of History and Culture and Nagasaki Prefectural Art Museum open.
 Sister city relationship established with Vaux-sur-Aure, France.
 2007
 April 17: , fatally targeting mayor Itoh.
 April 22: Tomihisa Taue becomes mayor.
 2010 - Population: 443,766.

See also
 Nagasaki history
 Timeline of Nagasaki (in Japanese)

References

This article incorporates information from the Japanese Wikipedia.

Bibliography

Published in the 19th century
 
 
 
 

Published in the 20th century
  (first published in 1727) 
 
 
 
 
 

Published in the 21st century
 
  (first published in 1987)
 
 Geoffrey C. Gunn, World Trade Systems of the East and West: Nagasaki and the Asian Bullion Trade Networks (Leiden: Brill, 2017)''

External links

 Maps of Nagasaki, 1945
 Items related to Nagasaki, various dates (via Europeana).
 Items related to Nagasaki, various dates (via Digital Public Library of America).
 Photos of Nagasaki by Felice Beato, 1860s

History of Nagasaki
 
Nagasaki
Years in Japan